Moreno Venezuelans are Venezuelans who are multiracial. It can refer to multiracial Venezuelans, who are either mulatto, mestizo, pardo, or zambo. Some moreno Venezuelans are also mixed with Asian ancestry, although this particular admixture is not nearly as common as the aforementioned ones.

According to the 2011 Census, those who identify as Moreno amount to 51.6% of Venezuela's population.

Per an autosomal DNA genetic study conducted in 2008 by the University of Brasília (UNB), Venezuela's gene pool is composed of 61% European contribution, 23% indigenous contribution, and 16% African contribution.

Census
The Census of Venezuela classifies the population as:
Black
 Afro descendant
 Moreno
White
 Other

See also

Demographics of Venezuela
Mestizo
Mestizo Colombian
Pardos

References 

Ethnic groups in Venezuela
 
 
Afro-Venezuelan
Mestizo